The 1998 Florida Attorney General election was held on November 3, 1998. Democratic incumbent Bob Butterworth defeated Republican nominee David H. Bludworth with 59.56% of the vote.

Primary elections
Primary elections were held on September 1, 1998.

Democratic primary

Candidates
Bob Butterworth, Florida Attorney General
Ellis Rubin, attorney

Results

Republican primary

Candidates
David H. Bludworth
Fred Dudley, State Senator

Results

General election

Candidates
Bob Butterworth, Democratic
David H. Bludworth, Republican

Results

References

1998
Attorney General
Florida